Thorstein Treholt (13 April 1911 –  17 March 1993) was a Norwegian politician for the Labour Party. He was the father of convicted Norwegian spy Arne Treholt.

He was born in Skoger.

An agronomist by education, Treholt was state secretary to the Minister of Agriculture from 1954 to 1957, serving under three different ministers during the period (Rasmus Nordbø, Olav Meisdalshagen and Harald Johan Løbak). He later became the Minister of Agriculture in 1971–1972 in the first cabinet Bratteli and 1973–1976 in the second cabinet Bratteli, the two periods only interrupted by the non-labour cabinet Korvald. Meanwhile, Treholt was appointed to cabinet his place was filled by Magne Kristian Mælumshagen and Åge Hovengen.

As an elected politician he was elected to the Norwegian Parliament from Oppland in 1958, and later re-elected on four occasions. On the local level he was a member of the municipality councils of Nord-Aurdal 1951–1955, Brandbu 1959–1961 and Gran from 1962 to 1967.

His career in politics ended with the post of County Governor of Oppland, which he held from 1976 to 1981.

References

1911 births
1993 deaths
Members of the Storting
Norwegian state secretaries
Ministers of Agriculture and Food of Norway
Labour Party (Norway) politicians
Oppland politicians
County governors of Norway
20th-century Norwegian politicians
Politicians from Drammen